B+ may refer to:

B+, a blood type
B+ (grade), an academic grade
B+ (photographer), an Irish photographer and filmmaker based in Los Angeles, California
B+ tree, a data structure
B+, a British home computer BBC Micro model
B+, a British single-board computer Raspberry Pi model
B+, the plus voltage of a Battery (electricity) or plus voltage of an electronic circuit
B Plus, a Belgian non-profit organization